Llovessonngs is an EP released by Chicago-based musician Bobby Conn, which was released in 1999 on Thrill Jockey

Track listing

All songs by Bobby Conn, except "Without You" by Pete Ham and Tom Evans, and "Maria B" by Caetano Veloso. All songs arranged by Bobby Conn and Julie Pomerleau

 "Free Love" (4:35)
 "Virginia" (6:16)
 "Without You" (5:40)
 "Maria B" (6:14)

Personnel

 Bobby Conn - vocals, guitar
 Virginia Montgomery - vocals on "Virginia"
 Monica Bou Bou - organ, strings, moog
 Darin Gray - bass
 Sarah Allen - drums
 Ernst Long - trumpet
 Jeb Bishop - trombone
 Fred Lonberg-Holm - cello
 Michael Zerang - Bass Drum, Congas, Tambourine

1999 EPs
Bobby Conn albums